Brian Lee Harvey (born 8 August 1974) is a British singer from London. He was the lead singer of pop group East 17. The later incarnation of the band, E-17, had two top 20 singles on the UK Singles Chart between 1998 and 1999, with the album Resurrection peaking within the top 50 of the UK Albums Chart. After leaving E-17, Harvey signed a record deal with Edel Records and had two singles released in 2001, "Straight Up (No Bends)" and "Loving You (Ole Ole Ole)".

Career
Harvey's vocal style emulated R&B and new jack swing vocalists from the United States. His vocals put him into a position of the group's frontman, or main member, which was shared with the group's creator, songwriter, instrumentalist, rapper and singer Tony Mortimer.

In 1997, Harvey was sacked from East 17 after making comments in a radio interview that appeared to condone the use of the drug ecstasy, causing an uproar in the press and the matter being raised in the Parliament of the United Kingdom. Mortimer left East 17 several months later. Harvey eventually rejoined the group under the rebranded name of E-17. As E-17, the group had two top 20 singles on the UK Singles Chart between 1998 and 1999, with the album Resurrection reaching the UK Top 50.

In 2000, Harvey collaborated with True Steppers with the song "True Step Tonight" featuring Donell Jones, which peaked at number 26 on the UK Singles Chart.

After E-17, he signed a record deal with Edel Records and had two singles released in 2001, "Straight Up (No Bends)" (No. 26 UK) and "Loving You (Ole Ole Ole)" (No. 20 UK).

In 2004, Harvey appeared in the fourth series of "I'm A Celebrity...Get Me Out Of Here!". Harvey walked out of the jungle after six days due to the passing of his grandmother.

On 17 March 2007, Harvey performed a song entitled "I Can" for Making Your Mind Up, the United Kingdom's national final for the Eurovision Song Contest. The song was written by singer Conner Reeves. Harvey was eliminated after the first round of voting and the eventual winners were Scooch.

In 2014, he released a new single, "Invisible". In 2019, Harvey was making music with rapper Cryptik Soul. He was featured in the songs "A Ghetto Luv Story" and "Bang 'Em Up" on Cryptik Soul's album Killer's Blood. The album was supported by the singles "Come & Save Me" and "Bang 'Em Up".

Personal life
Harvey was married to dancer Natasha Carnegie with whom he has a daughter.

On 12 December 2001, Harvey was attacked with a knife in a club car park in Nottingham. In May 2005, after being diagnosed with clinical depression, Harvey was hospitalised after an alleged suicide attempt. On 31 May 2005, he was re-admitted to hospital in a critical condition after falling under the wheels of his car.

Discography

Studio albums

East 17
 1992 – Walthamstow
 1994 – Steam
 1995 – Up All Night

E-17 
 1998 – Resurrection

Solo
2001: Solo

Singles
2000: "True Step Tonight" (True Steppers featuring Brian Harvey and Donell Jones) – No. 25 UK
2001: "Straight Up (No Bends)" – No. 26 UK
2001: "Loving You (Ole Ole Ole)" (Brian Harvey and The Refugee Crew) – No. 20 UK
2002: "Senorita"
2007: "I Can"
2010: "Going Backwardz"
2012: "This Isn't Love"
2012: "We Going In" (G.M.T.A featuring Brian Harvey)
2014: "Invisible"
2019: "Come & Save Me" (Cryptik Soul featuring Brian Harvey and Shotti)
2019: "Bang 'Em Up" (Cryptik Soul featuring the Styles of L, Kryptic and Brian Harvey)

References

1974 births
Living people
English male singers
British male singers
English pop singers
British pop singers
East 17 members
People from London
Sony Music Publishing artists
British contemporary R&B singers
I'm a Celebrity...Get Me Out of Here! (British TV series) participants
People educated at Sir George Monoux College